The 2018 Southern Conference women's soccer tournament was the postseason women's soccer tournament for the Southern Conference held from October 24 through November 4, 2018. The first round and quarterfinals of the tournament were held at campus sites, while the semifinals and final took place at Betts Stadium in Macon, Georgia. The ten-team single-elimination tournament consisted of four rounds based on seeding from regular season conference play. The UNC Greensboro Spartans were the defending champions and successfully defended their crown with a 2–1 win over the Furman Paladins in the final. This was the eighth Southern Conference tournament title for the UNC Greensboro women's soccer program and the second for head coach Michael Coll.

Bracket

Source:

Schedule

First Round

Quarterfinals

Semifinals

Final

Statistics

Goalscorers 
3 Goals
 Isabella Gutierrez - Furman
 Grace Regal - UNCG

2 Goals
 Kessy Bradshaw - The Citadel
 Whitney Edwards-Roberson - VMI
 Emily Jensen - UNCG
 Nicole Souply - UNCG
 Cienna Rideout - UNCG
 Jayley Younginer - Wofford

1 Goal
 Katherine Arroyo - The Citadel
 Sarah Connolly - ETSU
 Allie Duggan - ETSU
 Amber Levy - VMI
 Jordin Mosley - UNCG
 Caroline Orman - Samford
 Virginia Poe - Furman

All-Tournament team

Source:

See also 
 2018 Southern Conference Men's Soccer Tournament

Notes

References 

2018 Southern Conference women's soccer season
Southern Conference Women's Soccer Tournament